Ben Grosse is an American record producer and mixer, known for his signature sound involving metal and hard rock music. Grosse has mixed and produced numerous albums for popular artists such as Dream Theater, Marilyn Manson, Sevendust, Disturbed, Breaking Benjamin, Filter, Fuel, Depeche Mode, Richard Barone, Alter Bridge, Red, Vertical Horizon, Love and Death, Starset, Hollywood Undead, Ben Folds, Thirty Seconds to Mars, Underoath and many others. As the mixer for many well-known songs from artists like Red Hot Chili Peppers ("Higher Ground"), Republica ("Ready to Go" ), Third Eye Blind ("Graduate" from the Can't Hardly Wait soundtrack), and The Flaming Lips ("She Don't Use Jelly"), he currently works with a staff at his own studio, The Mix Room, in Burbank, California.

References

External links
 [ AllMusic.com entry]
 Complete Discography
 Artist Direct entry
 Recording Studio article 

American record producers
American audio engineers
Living people
Year of birth missing (living people)